The Sleeping Car Porter is a novel by Canadian writer Suzette Mayr, published in 2022 by Coach House Books. 

Set in the 1920s, the novel centres on Baxter, a Black Canadian and closeted gay immigrant from the Caribbean who is working as a railway porter to save money to fund his dream of getting educated as a dentist. 

Mayr credited poet Fred Wah with having given her the original suggestion to write about railway porters, and consulted books such as Cecil Foster's They Call Me George: The Untold Story of Black Train Porters and the Birth of Modern Canada, Stanley G. Grizzle's My Name's Not George: The Story of the Brotherhood of Sleeping Car Porters in Canada and Johnnie F. Kirvin's Hey Boy! Hey George: The Pullman Porter for insight into the job and its working conditions. She also likened the process of writing the novel to a sort of genealogy, telling Xtra! that "Part of being a queer person is trying to find your ancestors and it’s not necessarily about people you are biologically related to but people in the queer community who came before you and knowing that you have a place and you’re not the first and you’re not the only one. It was me excavating a past to find people like me."

Publishers Weekly named it one of the top ten works of fiction published in 2022.

Awards
It was the winner of the 2022 Giller Prize. It was the first LGBTQ-themed novel, and Mayr the first LGBTQ-identified writer, ever to win the Giller.

It was longlisted for the inaugural Carol Shields Prize for Fiction in 2023.

References

External links
The Sleeping Car Porter at Coach House Books

2022 Canadian novels
Black Canadian literature
Canadian LGBT novels
Scotiabank Giller Prize-winning works
Novels set in the 1920s
Novels set in Canada
2020s LGBT novels